Chipper is a nickname for:

 Damien Adkins (born 1981), Australian rules footballer
 Waverly Brown (1935–1981), New York police officer killed during an infamous 1981 armed robbery of a Brinks Armored Car
 Chipper Harris (1962–2018), American basketball player
 Chipper Jones (born 1972), American Major League baseball player
 Chipper Lowell, American comedian

See also 

 
 
 Chip (nickname)
 Chips (nickname)

Lists of people by nickname